Sekyere West District is a former district that was located in Ashanti Region, Ghana. Originally created as an ordinary district assembly in 1988, which was created from the former Sekyere District Council. However on 29 February 2008, it was split off into two new districts: Mampong Municipal District (which it was elevated to municipal district assembly status on that same year; capital: Mampong) and Sekyere Central District (capital: Nsuta). The district assembly was located in the northern part of Ashanti Region and had Mampong as its capital town.

Sources
 
 GhanaDistricts.com

Districts of Ashanti Region